Elleanthus robustus is a species of flowering plant from the orchid family, Orchidaceae.

Evelyna robusta is native to Colombia, Costa Rica, Ecuador, Peru and Venezuela

References

External links 
 
 

robustus
Orchids of Colombia
Orchids of Costa Rica
Orchids of Ecuador
Orchids of Peru

Terrestrial orchids